Sebes or variants may refer to:
 Sebeš, a river, bog and a suburb of Belgrade
 Sebeș, a city in Alba County
 Sebeș, a village in Hârseni Commune, Brașov County
 Sebeș, a village in Rușii-Munți Commune, Mureș County
 Sebeș (river), a river in Alba and Sibiu Counties, tributary of the Mureș 
 Sebeș (Cibin), a small river in Sibiu County, tributary of the Cibin
 Sebeș (Drăgan), a small river in Bihor and Cluj Counties, tributary of the Drăgan
 Sebeș, a small river in Mureș County, tributary of the Gurghiu
 Sebeș (Mureș), a small river in Mureș County, tributary of the Mureș
 Sebeș (Brașov), a small river in Brașov County, tributary of the Olt
 Sebeș (Sibiu), a small river in Sibiu County, tributary of the Olt
 Sebeș (Timiș), a small river in Caraș-Severin County, tributary of the Timiș
 Sebeș (Sovata), a small river in Mureș County, tributary of the Sovata

See also 
 Sebeșu (disambiguation)
 Sibișel (disambiguation)